Mabel Wilson may refer to:

 Mabel O. Wilson (born 1963), architect, designer, and scholar
 Mabel Rose Wilson (1883–1962), New Zealand domestic worker and community leader